Chloroxylon is a genus of trees in the family Rutaceae. The genus comprises two species, both desired for their wood as high quality tropical timber and heavily exploited.

It has rough and spongy outer bark. Timber is very tough and durable. It has a typical unpleasant smell.

Species
Chloroxylon swietenia - east Indian satinwood or Sri Lanka satinwood
Chloroxylon faho - Madagascar satinwood

References

Rutaceae genera
Rutoideae